Architecture is an oil on cardboard painting by the Swiss German painter Paul Klee, crearted in 1923. It is part of the his Magic Squares series, where Klee studies the effects of repeating the same elements, in a largely abstract style. It is held at the Neue Nationalgalerie, in Berlin.

History and description
Klee was teaching at Bauhaus, in 1923, and it can be considered that he was influenced by the importance that architecture had in that art school for this painting. It has been speculated that this and other paintings of the same period were influenced by Austrian composer Arnold Schoenberg recent development of a new, radical musical system of twelve tones, his Twelve-tone technique. The same similar approach to music by a geometrical way can be seen in this work and others of the same time.

Art critic and historian Will Grohmann states that he found a relation with Schönberg method in Klee's writings: "I found a slip of paper among Klee's papers on which was a plan for one of his pictures; numbers were written in the squares, a series of numbers ran first in one direction then in the other, crossing each other. When the numbers are added along the horizontals and verticals, the totals are equal, as in the well-known 'magic square.'"

See also
List of works by Paul Klee

References

External links

1923 paintings
Paintings by Paul Klee
Paintings in the collection of the Berlin State Museums